Watertown Council may refer to:

 Watertown Council (Wisconsin)
 Watertown Council (New York)